The Church of God, Mountain Assembly (CGMA) is a holiness Pentecostal Christian body formed in 1907, with roots in the late 19th-century American holiness movement and early 20th-century Pentecostal revival. The denomination maintains headquarters in Jellico, Tennessee and is a member of the Pentecostal/Charismatic Churches of North America (formerly the Pentecostal Fellowship of North America).

The main geographical strength of the body (about 65% of the churches) is in Kentucky, Ohio, and Tennessee. But, they are also in Florida, Georgia, North Carolina, Indiana, Montana, West Virginia, Alabama, Michigan, and Kansas. There were over 10,000 members in over 103 USA churches in 2018, and nearly 720 churches in 21 nations. The denominations World Missions Department serves foreign nations with children's homes, schools, pastors, and churches.

History
In the late nineteenth century, several ministers of the South Union Baptist Association of United Baptists embraced the holiness movement. At its annual session in 1905, the South Union Association of United Baptists excluded all ministers preaching entire sanctification and the danger of apostasy. On August 24, 1907, representatives met at Ryan’s Creek church in Whitley County, Kentucky and formed a new association. They chose the name Church of God. The early leaders were Reverends J. H. Parks, Steve Bryant, and Allen Moses. Shortly after organization, they embraced Pentecostalism. After discovering that other bodies were holding property and transacting business under the name Church of God, this body added the words "Mountain Assembly" to "Church of God" for identification and legal purposes in 1911. In 1917 the body was incorporated, and in 1922 permanent headquarters were established in Jellico, Tennessee.

The Gospel Herald, official publication of the Church of God Mountain Assembly, was first published in 1942. A more episcopal form of government was adopted in 1944, that included the offices of General Overseer and General Secretary and Treasurer.

The Church of God Mountain Assembly has endured three divisions since its formation, resulting in the formation of the General Assembly Church of God (org. 1916 in McCreary County, Kentucky), Church of God of the Union Assembly (org. 1920 in Jackson County, Georgia) and the Church of God of the Original Mountain Assembly (org. 1946 at Williamsburg, Kentucky).

Doctrine
The church utilizes a Church Covenant, and holds a twelve article Statement of Faith. Doctrines of the Church of God Mountain Assembly include:
the Bible as the inspired, infallible Word of God
God in three distinct persons – Father, Son and Holy Ghost
the deity, virgin birth, sinless life, sacrificial atonement, and bodily resurrection of Jesus Christ
salvation by faith through regeneration by the Holy Ghost
sanctification as a second work of grace
the full Gospel of the New Testament including divine healing and other gifts of the Spirit
water baptism by immersion, The Lord's Supper as Ordinances
the pre-Millennial second coming of Christ
In speaking with other tongues as the Spirit gives them utterance and that it is the initial evidence of the baptism of the Holy Ghost

Annual convention
Their annual Campmeeting convention is the first week of August in Pigeon Forge, TN, and their annual Florida Campmeeting is the last week of January in Kissimmee, Florida.

Further reading
Encyclopedia of American Religions, J. Gordon Melton, editor
Yearbook of American and Canadian Churches, 2018, American Council of Churches
The History of the Church of God Mountain Assembly, Inc., Luther Gibson
CGMA Constitutional Declaration & Bylaws, CGMA

Pentecostal denominations in North America
Church of God denominations
Christian denominations established in the 20th century
Christian new religious movements
Pentecostalism in Tennessee
Christianity in Appalachia
Holiness denominations
1907 establishments in Kentucky